An aphrodisiac is a substance which increases sexual desire.

Aphrodisiac may also refer to:

Albums
 Aphrodisiac, an album by FM

Songs
 "Aphrodisiac" (song), a song by Eleftheria Eleftheriou
 "Aphrodisiac", a song by Dennis Edwards
 "Aphrodisiac", a song by Bow Wow Wow from the album When the Going Gets Tough, the Tough Get Going
 "Aphrodisiac", a song by Amanda Lear from the album Secret Passion
 "Aphrodisiac", a song by Andre Williams
 "Aphrodisiac", a song by Jin Akanishi from the album Japonicana

See also
 Aphrodisiac I and Aphrodisiac II, films by Hugh Parker Guiler
 
 Aphrodisias (disambiguation)
 Afrodisiac (disambiguation)
 Afrodisíaco, an album by Rauw Alejandro